The Audi Le Mans quattro is a concept car, developed by German automobile manufacturer Audi, for presentation at the 2003 Frankfurt Motor Show, to celebrate Audi's three successive wins at the arduous 24 Hours of Le Mans endurance race in 2000, 2001, and 2002. It was the third and final concept car designed by Audi in 2003, following the Pikes Peak quattro and the Nuvolari quattro.

Audi's subsidiary quattro GmbH subsequently decided to produce the Audi Le Mans Quattro as a production road car, calling it the R8, naming it after Audi's R8 LMP race car, which is notable for being one of the most successful cars in the history of the 24 Hours of Le Mans with five overall wins.

Design and technical

The Audi Le Mans quattro has a number of high-technology features, including the headlights  composed entirely of light-emitting diodes (LEDs). The structural framework of the body, the Audi Space Frame, shared with the Lamborghini Gallardo, is made entirely of aluminium, while the outer skin is made out of carbon fibre and aluminium.

The Le Mans quattro featured the magnetic ride magneto rheological dampers, also installed in the latest TT, which gives the car a firmer and more responsive drive and improved handling characteristics. In Audi tradition, the car features quattro permanent four-wheel drive to optimise traction and handling.

The transmission is the six-speed automated manual transmission that was also shared with the Gallardo and developed by Volkswagen.

The car showcased various Audi styling cues and technological details, planned to be used in future production Audi models.

Specifications and performance 
Power: 
Torque: 
Engine: 5.0 L DOHC twin-turbocharged TFSI V10
0–100 km/h: 3.7 seconds
Top speed:

In popular culture 
The Le Mans quattro is featured prominently in the 2006 arcade racing video game Need For Speed: Carbon as the car of the game's antagonist Darius (Tahmoh Penikett).

See also

Audi RSQ

References

External links

 Audi corporate website
   -
 Picture gallery at worldcarfans

Audi concept vehicles
Audi